The 2007–08 Pittsburgh Penguins season was the franchise's 41st season in the National Hockey League (NHL). Their regular season began on October 5, 2007, against the Carolina Hurricanes and concluded on April 6, 2008, against the rival Philadelphia Flyers. The Penguins looked to improve upon their progress in the 2006–07 season after being eliminated in the first round of the Eastern Conference playoffs by the Ottawa Senators.  During the season, the Penguins wore gold patches with "250" on them, honoring the city of Pittsburgh's 250th anniversary in 2008.

Evgeni Malkin scored 106 points in the regular season, helping to offset the gap left while Sidney Crosby was injured. Goaltender Ty Conklin replaced Marc-Andre Fleury, who was also injured, to win 18 games. The team surpassed their record for total attendance, selling out all 41 home games for the first time in franchise history. The Penguins also participated in the AMP Energy NHL Winter Classic, which set the NHL single-game attendance record.

During the regular season, the Penguins finished second in the Eastern Conference, behind the Montreal Canadiens. With a 12–2 record in the Eastern Conference playoffs, the team eliminated the Senators, the New York Rangers and the Flyers, on their way to the 2008 Stanley Cup Finals, the franchise's first in 16 years. The team was defeated in the Stanley Cup Final by the Detroit Red Wings in six games.

Regular season

The Penguins' offseason activities began in May 2007, with the team naming Sidney Crosby its captain.  At just 19 years old, Crosby became the youngest captain in NHL history. Crosby was named the first Penguins captain since the retirement of Mario Lemieux in January 2006; Crosby, Mark Recchi, Sergei Gonchar and John LeClair served as alternate captains after Lemieux's retirement. Veteran Gary Roberts was named as an alternate captain for the new season, joining Recchi and Gonchar. The Penguins also extended head coach Michel Therrien's contract through the 2008–09 season.

On September 17, the NHL announced that on January 1, 2008, the Penguins would travel to Orchard Park, New York to play the Buffalo Sabres outdoors at Ralph Wilson Stadium in the AMP Energy NHL Winter Classic. The event marked the first time a regular-season contest was played outdoors in the United States.

The Penguins began the regular season on October 5 visiting the Carolina Hurricanes. The team played their home-opener against the Anaheim Ducks on October 6 in front of a standing-room-only crowd of 17,132, the first of 41 sellouts over the course of the season. Through November 21, the Penguins acquired a record of 8–11–2, going 2–6–1 against Atlantic Division teams in November including a four-game losing streak, their longest of the season. Following a Thanksgiving Day shootout victory against the Ottawa Senators, the Penguins won seven of the next eight games, including the franchise's first sweep of a Western Canada road trip. Beginning on December 23, the Penguins compiled a point streak of ten games, including eight consecutive victories, the longest winning streak for the Penguins in nearly ten years. In January and February, the team was 16–6–5, climbing the conference standings with the help of goaltender Ty Conklin and center Evgeni Malkin. During the final full month, in March, the team was 10–4–1, and 7–0–0 at home in Mellon Arena. The team concluded the regular season with a home-and-home series against the Philadelphia Flyers, with each team winning a game.

The Penguins suffered from several injuries during the season. Many of the injuries were long-term. By the end of the season, the team had missed a combined total of over 280 man games due to injury. Goalie Marc-Andre Fleury sustained a high-ankle sprain against the Calgary Flames on December 6. Following the injury, Fleury was ruled out for six to eight weeks. The Penguins recalled Ty Conklin from the American Hockey League to serve as a back-up to Dany Sabourin on an emergency basis.  Conklin started for the first time on December 20, winning the game 5–4 in a shootout. After winning his first nine starts and supplanting Sabourin as the starting goaltender, Conklin lost his first game, a shootout, on January 12 against the Atlanta Thrashers. Before Fleury's eventual return as a starter on March 2, Conklin recorded a mark of 17–6–5, while Sabourin went 4–6–0.

Crosby also sustained a high ankle sprain on January 18 against the Tampa Bay Lightning and was ruled out for six to eight weeks. Crosby returned on March 4, playing in three games before being removed from the lineup again on March 12. After missing the next seven games, Crosby returned against the New York Islanders on March 27, after missing 28 games. The injury forced Crosby to miss the All-Star Game, where he was the leading vote-getter for the second year in a row. Teammate Evgeni Malkin was selected to play for the Eastern Conference team in place of the injured Crosby.

Following the release of Recchi in early December and injuries to Crosby and Roberts (Recchi's replacement), Sergei Gonchar remained the Penguins' only active captain. The team assigned two new alternate captains, with Ryan Malone and Darryl Sydor serving during the injuries.

After the injury to Crosby on January 18, a makeshift line composed of Malkin, Malone and Petr Sykora, dubbed the "Steel City Line", helped sustain the Penguins' standing. Malkin scored 46 points during Crosby's absence.

Winter Classic

With an attendance of 71,417, the Winter Classic, held on January 1, 2008, at Ralph Wilson Stadium, surpassed the NHL single-game attendance record set on November 22, 2003, when the Edmonton Oilers hosted the Montreal Canadiens at Commonwealth Stadium in Edmonton before 57,167 fans in the 2003 Heritage Classic. The New Year's Day game between the Penguins and the Buffalo Sabres was broadcast nationwide on NBC in the United States, CBC in Canada, all Westwood One affiliates in the US and Canada and on XM satellite radio. The Penguins defeated the Sabres, 2–1, with a shootout goal from Crosby.

Fan support
On December 21, 2007, at a game against the New York Islanders, the Penguins tied a franchise record with 30 straight regular-season sellouts, dating to the second half of the 2006–07 season. The record was surpassed at the next home game against the Boston Bruins on December 23, with the 31st consecutive sellout of the regular season. On March 12, against the Buffalo Sabres, with a standing-room-only crowd of 17,132, the Penguins set a franchise record after selling out all 35 games to date, surpassing the record set during the 1988–89 and 1989–90 seasons when the Penguins sold out 34 of 40 home games. For the first time in the franchise's 41-year history, the team sold out all 41 home games, concluding with their Atlantic Division-clinching victory over the Philadelphia Flyers on April 2. At 17,089, the average attendance for a home game was greater than Mellon Arena's seating capacity of 16,940, causing the team's season attendance to exceed 100% capacity. The 67 consecutive sellouts attracted 888,653 total fans, a record for home attendance for the franchise.

The March 27 game against the Islanders received a television rating of 10.7, the second-highest rating all-time for a Penguins game. The only game to draw a higher rating, at 15.9, was the comeback of Mario Lemieux against the Toronto Maple Leafs on December 27, 2000. The flagship station for Penguins television broadcasts, FSN Pittsburgh, had the highest-rated NHL broadcasts of any of the Fox Sports Net regional affiliates for the second year in a row.

Strong support from fans continued into the playoffs, as the Penguins sold out their first two home games in 11 minutes. The team erected a 12 by 16 foot LED screen on the lawn directly outside Mellon Arena, allowing fans to watch all playoff games outside of the stadium, free of charge. A rally scheduled by Allegheny County executive Dan Onorato and Mayor Luke Ravenstahl took place in front of the Allegheny County Courthouse prior to Game 2 of the team's first-round series on April 11. The Penguins' third game of the playoffs attracted the third-highest regional viewing audience all-time for a Penguins game. The 4,200 tickets offered for the team's first two home games of Round Two sold out within 10 minutes. As the playoffs advanced into the later rounds, the team had growing support from players and coaches of other teams in Pittsburgh, including the Steelers and Pirates, and many of the players attended games. Steelers head coach Mike Tomlin watched Game 6 of the Finals outside Mellon Arena, along with 3,000 other fans. Prior to the Stanley Cup Final, Mayor Ravenstahl led a rally in the city's Market Square, which featured chanting by the several hundred people in attendance; cooked octopus was also served by 's Fish Market, in reference to the Detroit tradition of throwing octopi onto the ice. The team also opened up Mellon Arena for fans to watch away games on the JumboTron during the Stanley Cup Final; over 13,500 people attended Game 1. Fans who watched the three games played in Detroit raised over $85,000 for the Mario Lemieux Foundation for cancer research. The Penguins also ranked first in the league in merchandise sales.

In an annual survey of over 80,000 fans conducted by ESPN The Magazine titled "Ultimate Standings: Fan Satisfaction Rankings," the Penguins ranked as the best National Hockey League team in terms of fan relations. The team also ranked third in that category, out of all 122 major sports franchises of the National Football League, National Basketball Association, Major League Baseball and the NHL. In the overall standings, the Penguins ranked seventh in the NHL, and 24th of the 122 teams in all four leagues. During the 2006–07 season, the team ranked 11th in the NHL, and 35th overall.

Plans for the future
During the All-Star break, the league announced that the Penguins would open the 2008–09 season with games on October 4 and 5 against the Ottawa Senators at the Globe Arena in Stockholm, Sweden.  Also, the  New York Rangers would open against the Tampa Bay Lightning in Prague, Czech Republic. Later, on March 12, the league and the NHL Players Association announced that the Penguins would play an exhibition game against Jokerit of the SM-liiga, the top professional league in Finland, on October 2, at Hartwall Arena in Helsinki.

Progress was made towards the team's new arena on March 22, when the former St. Francis Hospital, across the street from Mellon Arena, was imploded. Following debris removal and site preparation, groundbreaking for construction began in the summer.

Season results
The Penguins clinched their second consecutive playoff berth on March 25 in a 2–0 victory against the New Jersey Devils and earned the second-seed in the Eastern Conference. Two years removed from their last-place Eastern Conference finish in 2006, the Penguins clinched the Atlantic Division for the first time ever, when they defeated the Philadelphia Flyers, 4–2. The division championship was the first for the Penguins since winning the Northeast Division in 1998. It was the best finish by the team since finishing second in the 1997–98 season. The 102 points the Penguins gained during the season was the team's fifth 100-point season. The Penguins raised banners for their top finish in the Atlantic Division and subsequent Eastern Conference playoff championship prior to the first Mellon Arena home game of the 2008–09 season.

This was the first time since the New York Rangers won the 1994 Stanley Cup that the Atlantic Division title was not won by either the New Jersey Devils or the Philadelphia Flyers.

Game log

|-  style="background:#fcf;"
| 1 || 5 || 7:00 PM || Pittsburgh Penguins || 1–4 || Carolina Hurricanes || PNC Arena (17,816) || 0–1–0 || 0
|-  style="background:#cfc;"
| 2 || 6 || 7:30 PM || Anaheim Ducks || 4–5 || Pittsburgh Penguins || Civic Arena (17,132) || 1–1–0 || 2
|-  style="background:#fcf;"
| 3 || 10 || 7:30 PM || Montreal Canadiens || 3–2 || Pittsburgh Penguins || Civic Arena (17,006) || 1–2–0 || 2
|-  style="background:#cfc;"
| 4 || 13 || 7:00 PM || Pittsburgh Penguins || 6–4 || Toronto Maple Leafs || Air Canada Centre (19,479) || 2–2–0 || 4
|-  style="background:#fcf;"
| 5 || 17 || 7:30 PM || New Jersey Devils || 5–4 || Pittsburgh Penguins || Civic Arena (16,990) || 2–3–0 || 4
|-  style="background:#cfc;"
| 6 || 19 || 7:30 PM || Carolina Hurricanes || 3–4 SO || Pittsburgh Penguins || Civic Arena (17,132) || 3–3–0 || 6
|-  style="background:#cfc;"
| 7 || 20 || 7:00 PM || Pittsburgh Penguins || 2–1 || Washington Capitals || Verizon Center (18,277) || 4–3–0 || 8
|-  style="background:#cfc;"
| 8 || 23 || 7:00 PM || New York Rangers || 0–1 || Pittsburgh Penguins || Civic Arena (17,012) || 5–3–0 || 10
|-  style="background:#fcf;"
| 9 || 25 || 7:30 PM || Toronto Maple Leafs || 5–2 || Pittsburgh Penguins || Civic Arena (17,051) || 5–4–0 || 10
|-  style="background:#ffc;"
| 10 || 27 || 7:00 PM || Montreal Canadiens || 4–3 SO || Pittsburgh Penguins || Civic Arena (17,085) || 5–4–1 || 11
|-  style="background:#cfc;"
| 11 || 30 || 7:00 PM || Pittsburgh Penguins || 4–2 || Minnesota Wild || Xcel Energy Center (18,568) || 6–4–1 || 13
|-

|-  style="background:#fcf;"
| 12 || 1 || 9:00 PM || Pittsburgh Penguins || 2–3 || Colorado Avalanche || Pepsi Center (18,007) || 6–5–1 || 13
|-  style="background:#fcf;"
| 13 || 3 || 7:00 PM || Pittsburgh Penguins || 2–3 || New York Islanders || Nassau Coliseum (16,234) || 6–6–1 || 13
|-  style="background:#cfc;"
| 14 || 5 || 7:00 PM || Pittsburgh Penguins || 5–0 || New Jersey Devils || Prudential Center (14,032) || 7–6–1 || 15
|-  style="background:#fcf;"
| 15 || 7 || 7:00 PM || Philadelphia Flyers || 3–1 || Pittsburgh Penguins || Civic Arena (17,132) || 7–7–1 || 15
|-  style="background:#fcf;"
| 16 || 8 || 7:00 PM || Pittsburgh Penguins || 2–4 || New York Rangers || Madison Square Garden (IV) (18,200) || 7–8–1 || 15
|-  style="background:#fcf;"
| 17 || 10 || 7:00 PM || Pittsburgh Penguins || 2–5 || Philadelphia Flyers || Wells Fargo Center (19,859) || 7–9–1 || 15
|-  style="background:#fcf;"
| 18 || 12 || 7:30 PM || New Jersey Devils || 3–2 || Pittsburgh Penguins || Civic Arena (17,096) || 7–10–1 || 15
|-  style="background:#cfc;"
| 19 || 15 || 7:30 PM || New York Islanders || 2–3 || Pittsburgh Penguins || Civic Arena (16,972) || 8–10–1 || 17
|-  style="background:#ffc;"
| 20 || 17 || 7:30 PM || New York Rangers || 4–3 OT || Pittsburgh Penguins || Civic Arena (17,125) || 8–10–2 || 18
|-  style="background:#fcf;"
| 21 || 21 || 7:30 PM || New Jersey Devils || 2–1 || Pittsburgh Penguins || Civic Arena (17,132) || 8–11–2 || 18
|-  style="background:#cfc;"
| 22 || 22 || 7:30 PM || Pittsburgh Penguins || 6–5 SO || Ottawa Senators || Canadian Tire Centre (20,061) || 9–11–2 || 20
|-  style="background:#cfc;"
| 23 || 24 || 7:30 PM || Atlanta Thrashers || 0–5 || Pittsburgh Penguins || Civic Arena (17,132) || 10–11–2 || 22
|-  style="background:#cfc;"
| 24 || 30 || 7:30 PM || Dallas Stars || 1–4 || Pittsburgh Penguins || Civic Arena (17,132) || 11–11–2 || 24
|-

|-  style="background:#fcf;"
| 25 || 1 || 7:00 PM || Pittsburgh Penguins || 2–4 || Toronto Maple Leafs || Air Canada Centre (19,534) || 11–12–2 || 24
|-  style="background:#cfc;"
| 26 || 3 || 7:30 PM || Phoenix Coyotes || 1–3 || Pittsburgh Penguins || Civic Arena (16,979) || 12–12–2 || 26
|-  style="background:#cfc;"
| 27 || 5 || 9:30 PM || Pittsburgh Penguins || 4–2 || Edmonton Oilers || Rexall Place (16,839) || 13–12–2 || 28
|-  style="background:#cfc;"
| 28 || 6 || 9:00 PM || Pittsburgh Penguins || 3–2 SO || Calgary Flames || Scotiabank Saddledome (19,289) || 14–12–2 || 30
|-  style="background:#cfc;"
| 29 || 8 || 10:00 PM || Pittsburgh Penguins || 2–1 SO || Vancouver Canucks || Rogers Arena (18,630) || 15–12–2 || 32
|-  style="background:#fcf;"
| 30 || 11 || 7:00 PM || Pittsburgh Penguins || 2–8 || Philadelphia Flyers || Wells Fargo Center (19,409) || 15–13–2 || 32
|-  style="background:#fcf;"
| 31 || 13 || 7:30 PM || Ottawa Senators || 4–1 || Pittsburgh Penguins || Civic Arena (16,982) || 15–14–2 || 32
|-  style="background:#cfc;"
| 32 || 15 || 7:00 PM || Pittsburgh Penguins || 3–2 || New York Islanders || Nassau Coliseum (15,269) || 16–14–2 || 34
|-  style="background:#fcf;"
| 33 || 18 || 7:00 PM || Pittsburgh Penguins || 0–4 || New York Rangers || Madison Square Garden (IV) (18,200) || 16–15–2 || 34
|-  style="background:#cfc;"
| 34 || 20 || 7:00 PM || Pittsburgh Penguins || 5–4 SO || Boston Bruins || TD Garden (15,304) || 17–15–2 || 36
|-  style="background:#fcf;"
| 35 || 21 || 7:30 PM || New York Islanders || 4–2 || Pittsburgh Penguins || Civic Arena (17,008) || 17–16–2 || 36
|-  style="background:#cfc;"
| 36 || 23 || 3:00 PM || Boston Bruins || 2–4 || Pittsburgh Penguins || Civic Arena (17,060) || 18–16–2 || 38
|-  style="background:#cfc;"
| 37 || 27 || 7:30 PM || Washington Capitals || 3–4 OT || Pittsburgh Penguins || Civic Arena (17,132) || 19–16–2 || 40
|-  style="background:#cfc;"
| 38 || 29 || 7:30 PM || Buffalo Sabres || 0–2 || Pittsburgh Penguins || Civic Arena (17,132) || 20–16–2 || 42
|-

|-  style="background:#cfc;"
| 39 || 1 || 1:00 PM || Pittsburgh Penguins || 2–1 SO || Buffalo Sabres || Ralph Wilson Stadium (71,217) || 21–16–2 || 44
|-  style="background:#cfc;"
| 40 || 3 || 7:30 PM || Toronto Maple Leafs || 2–6 || Pittsburgh Penguins || Civic Arena (17,074) || 22–16–2 || 46
|-  style="background:#cfc;"
| 41 || 5 || 3:00 PM || Florida Panthers || 0–3 || Pittsburgh Penguins || Civic Arena (17,090) || 23–16–2 || 48
|-  style="background:#cfc;"
| 42 || 8 || 7:30 PM || Pittsburgh Penguins || 3–1 || Florida Panthers || BB&T Center (17,086) || 24–16–2 || 50
|-  style="background:#cfc;"
| 43 || 10 || 7:30 PM || Pittsburgh Penguins || 4–1 || Tampa Bay Lightning || Amalie Arena (20,426) || 25–16–2 || 52
|-  style="background:#ffc;"
| 44 || 12 || 7:00 PM || Pittsburgh Penguins || 2–3 SO || Atlanta Thrashers || Philips Arena (18,545) || 25–16–3 || 53
|-  style="background:#cfc;"
| 45 || 14 || 7:00 PM || New York Rangers || 1–4 || Pittsburgh Penguins || Civic Arena (17,000) || 26–16–3 || 55
|-  style="background:#fcf;"
| 46 || 18 || 7:30 PM || Tampa Bay Lightning || 3–0 || Pittsburgh Penguins || Civic Arena (17,132) || 26–17–3 || 55
|-  style="background:#cfc;"
| 47 || 19 || 7:00 PM || Pittsburgh Penguins || 2–0 || Montreal Canadiens || Bell Centre (21,273) || 27–17–3 || 57
|-  style="background:#ffc;"
| 48 || 21 || 7:30 PM || Washington Capitals || 6–5 SO || Pittsburgh Penguins || Civic Arena (17,050) || 27–17–4 || 58
|-  style="background:#fcf;"
| 49 || 24 || 7:00 PM || Pittsburgh Penguins || 3–4 || Philadelphia Flyers || Wells Fargo Center (19,807) || 27–18–4 || 58
|-  style="background:#cfc;"
| 50 || 29 || 7:00 PM || Pittsburgh Penguins || 4–2 || New Jersey Devils || Prudential Center (13,595) || 28–18–4 || 60
|-  style="background:#fcf;"
| 51 || 30 || 7:00 PM || Pittsburgh Penguins || 1–4 || Atlanta Thrashers || Philips Arena (14,070) || 28–19–4 || 60
|-

|-  style="background:#cfc;"
| 52 || 2 || 7:30 PM || Carolina Hurricanes || 1–4 || Pittsburgh Penguins || Civic Arena (17,058) || 29–19–4 || 62
|-  style="background:#ffc;"
| 53 || 4 || 7:00 PM || Pittsburgh Penguins || 3–4 OT || New Jersey Devils || Prudential Center (13,012) || 29–19–5 || 63
|-  style="background:#cfc;"
| 54 || 7 || 7:30 PM || New York Islanders || 3–4 || Pittsburgh Penguins || Civic Arena (17,075) || 30–19–5 || 65
|-  style="background:#cfc;"
| 55 || 9 || 1:00 PM || Los Angeles Kings || 2–4 || Pittsburgh Penguins || Civic Arena (17,034) || 31–19–5 || 67
|-  style="background:#cfc;"
| 56 || 10 || 1:00 PM || Philadelphia Flyers || 3–4 || Pittsburgh Penguins || Civic Arena (17,132) || 32–19–5 || 69
|-  style="background:#fcf;"
| 57 || 13 || 7:30 PM || Boston Bruins || 2–1 || Pittsburgh Penguins || Civic Arena (16,982) || 32–20–5 || 69
|-  style="background:#fcf;"
| 58 || 14 || 7:00 PM || Pittsburgh Penguins || 2–4 || Carolina Hurricanes || PNC Arena (14,922) || 32–21–5 || 69
|-  style="background:#cfc;"
| 59 || 17 || 6:00 PM || Pittsburgh Penguins || 4–1 || Buffalo Sabres || First Niagara Center (18,690) || 33–21–5 || 71
|-  style="background:#cfc;"
| 60 || 19 || 7:30 PM || Florida Panthers || 2–3 || Pittsburgh Penguins || Civic Arena (17,075) || 34–21–5 || 73
|-  style="background:#cfc;"
| 61 || 21 || 7:30 PM || Pittsburgh Penguins || 5–4 || Montreal Canadiens || Bell Centre (21,273) || 35–21–5 || 75
|-  style="background:#ffc;"
| 62 || 23 || 3:00 PM || Ottawa Senators || 4–3 OT || Pittsburgh Penguins || Civic Arena (17,132) || 35–21–6 || 76
|-  style="background:#ffc;"
| 63 || 24 || 3:00 PM || San Jose Sharks || 2–1 SO || Pittsburgh Penguins || Civic Arena (17,132) || 35–21–7 || 77
|-  style="background:#cfc;"
| 64 || 26 || 7:00 PM || Pittsburgh Penguins || 4–2 || New York Islanders || Nassau Coliseum (11,258) || 36–21–7 || 79
|-  style="background:#fcf;"
| 65 || 28 || 7:00 PM || Pittsburgh Penguins || 1–5 || Boston Bruins || TD Garden (17,565) || 36–22–7 || 79
|-

|-  style="background:#fcf;"
| 66 || 1 || 3:00 PM || Pittsburgh Penguins || 4–5 || Ottawa Senators || Canadian Tire Centre (20,153) || 36–23–7 || 79
|-  style="background:#cfc;"
| 67 || 2 || 3:00 PM || Atlanta Thrashers || 2–3 SO || Pittsburgh Penguins || Civic Arena (17,132) || 37–23–7 || 81
|-  style="background:#cfc;"
| 68 || 4 || 7:30 PM || Pittsburgh Penguins || 2–0 || Tampa Bay Lightning || Amalie Arena (19,206) || 38–23–7 || 83
|-  style="background:#fcf;"
| 69 || 6 || 7:30 PM || Pittsburgh Penguins || 2–5 || Florida Panthers || BB&T Center (17,012) || 38–24–7 || 83
|-  style="background:#cfc;"
| 70 || 9 || 12:30 PM || Pittsburgh Penguins || 4–2 || Washington Capitals || Verizon Center (18,277) || 39–24–7 || 85
|-  style="background:#cfc;"
| 71 || 12 || 7:30 PM || Buffalo Sabres || 3–7 || Pittsburgh Penguins || Civic Arena (17,132) || 40–24–7 || 87
|-  style="background:#cfc;"
| 72 || 16 || 12:00 PM || Philadelphia Flyers || 1–7 || Pittsburgh Penguins || Civic Arena (17,132) || 41–24–7 || 89
|-  style="background:#fcf;"
| 73 || 18 || 7:00 PM || Pittsburgh Penguins || 2–5 || New York Rangers || Madison Square Garden (IV) (18,200) || 41–25–7 || 89
|-  style="background:#cfc;"
| 74 || 20 || 7:30 PM || Tampa Bay Lightning || 2–4 || Pittsburgh Penguins || Civic Arena (17,044) || 42–25–7 || 91
|-  style="background:#cfc;"
| 75 || 22 || 7:30 PM || New Jersey Devils || 1–7 || Pittsburgh Penguins || Civic Arena (17,132) || 43–25–7 || 93
|-  style="background:#fcf;"
| 76 || 24 || 7:00 PM || Pittsburgh Penguins || 1–4 || New York Islanders || Nassau Coliseum (16,234) || 43–26–7 || 93
|-  style="background:#cfc;"
| 77 || 25 || 7:00 PM || Pittsburgh Penguins || 2–0 || New Jersey Devils || Prudential Center (16,292) || 44–26–7 || 95
|-  style="background:#cfc;"
| 78 || 27 || 7:30 PM || New York Islanders || 1–3 || Pittsburgh Penguins || Civic Arena (17,025) || 45–26–7 || 97
|-  style="background:#cfc;"
| 79 || 30 || 12:30 PM || New York Rangers || 1–3 || Pittsburgh Penguins || Civic Arena (17,020) || 46–26–7 || 99
|-  style="background:#ffc;"
| 80 || 31 || 7:00 PM || Pittsburgh Penguins || 1–2 OT || New York Rangers || Madison Square Garden (IV) (18,200) || 46–26–8 || 100
|-

|-  style="background:#cfc;"
| 81 || 2 || 7:30 PM || Philadelphia Flyers || 2–4 || Pittsburgh Penguins || Civic Arena (17,132) || 47–26–8 || 102
|-  style="background:#fcf;"
| 82 || 6 || 3:00 PM || Pittsburgh Penguins || 0–2 || Philadelphia Flyers || Wells Fargo Center (19,767) || 47–27–8 || 102
|-

|- style="text-align:center;"
| Legend:       = Win       = Loss       = OT/SO Loss

Divisional standings

Conference standings

Detailed records
Final

Playoffs

Eastern Conference Quarterfinal
The Penguins opened the playoffs against the seventh-seeded Ottawa Senators, in the Eastern Conference Quarterfinal, a rematch of the previous season's first round matchup that saw Ottawa win in five games. In the opening game on April 9 in Pittsburgh's Mellon Arena, the Penguins defeated the Senators 4–0. In the game, Evgeni Malkin scored his first career playoff goal, Marc-Andre Fleury recorded his first career playoff shutout, Petr Sykora added a goal and Gary Roberts scored twice. In Game 2, the Penguins took a lead of 3–0 following a goal from Sergei Gonchar and two from Sykora. The Senators came back to tie the game in the third period, before Ryan Malone scored twice to give the Penguins their second victory in the series. The Pens scored four unanswered goals from Maxime Talbot, Sidney Crosby, Jordan Staal and Marian Hossa to defeat the Senators 4–1 in Game 3, the first game in Ottawa's Scotiabank Place. Two days later, the Penguins managed to eliminate the Senators in four games, the only team to do so in the first round. The team got goals from Malkin, Crosby and the series-winner from Jarkko Ruutu in the second period to defeat the Senators, 3–1. The Penguins were the first team to advance from the opening round. The series win was the team's first since the 2001 playoffs, and the first sweep of a playoff series in 16 years.

Eastern Conference semifinals
The Penguins began the Eastern Conference Semi-final against their Atlantic Division rival New York Rangers on April 25. The team overcame a 3–0 deficit to defeat the Rangers 5–4 in Game 1. Hossa tied the game 4:40 into the third period, and Sykora took the lead twenty seconds later. After Scott Gomez tied the game at four, Malkin scored the game-winning goal, deflecting a shot by Crosby with 1:41 left. In Game 2, Staal scored a powerplay goal to take a 1–0 lead. In the last minute, Adam Hall shot the puck down ice, and it drifted into the empty net. Marc-Andre Fleury saved all 26 shots, and the Penguins took a 2–0 lead in the series. The Penguins entered Game 3 at Madison Square Gardens after going 0–3–1 in the building during the regular season. They led 3–1 after the first period, before Jaromir Jagr tied the game. Malkin scored on the powerplay with 2:07 left in the second period to take the lead, and Malone added a goal in the third to give the Pens a 5–3 win, and a 3–0 series lead. The Penguins lost their first game of the post-season in Game 4 against the Rangers. Jagr scored in the second period, Brandon Dubinsky in the third and Jagr scored again on an empty net goal in the last minute to force Game 5. In Game 5, the Penguins took a 2–0 lead in the second period after goals from Malkin and Hossa before the Rangers tied in the third. The game entered overtime, the first of the playoffs for the Penguins, where Hossa scored his second goal of the game 7:10 in. With the goal, the Penguins advanced to the Eastern Conference Finals.

Eastern Conference Final
The Eastern Conference Final began between the Penguins and the Philadelphia Flyers on May 9. Malkin scored with 7 seconds left in the first period to take a 3–2 lead, and extended the advantage with a shorthanded goal in the second period, giving the Penguins a 1–0 advantage in the series after Game 1. In Game 2, Talbot scored to take the lead in the third period, and Staal added an empty-net goal to give the Penguins a 4–2 win and a 2–0 series lead. The win was the Penguins' seventh consecutive home playoff win, a franchise record, improving on a six-game streak in the 1992 playoffs. The Penguins also became only the fifth team to start the playoffs with a 10–1 record, and the first since the Detroit Red Wings in 1995. Game 3 saw the series move across the state to Philadelphia; the Penguins struck quickly with goals from Ryan Whitney and Hossa within the first eight minutes. Hossa added his second goal on an empty net to seal the victory. With the win, the Penguins become the first team since the 1983 Edmonton Oilers to start the playoffs 11–1. The Penguins failed to close out the Eastern Conference Finals with a sweep of the Flyers in Game 4, losing 4–2. The Flyers jumped out to a 3–0 lead in the first period. The Penguins fought back getting two goals from Jordan Staal in the third period, but Joffrey Lupul's second goal on an empty net sealed the win for the Flyers. The series returned to Pittsburgh for Game 5, where the Penguins won their eighth consecutive home game by a final score of 6–0, the Prince of Wales Trophy, and a trip to the Stanley Cup Final.

Stanley Cup Final

The Penguins faced the Western Conference Champion and Presidents' Trophy winning Detroit Red Wings for the Stanley Cup. The best-of-seven series began in Detroit on May 24, the first series the Penguins opened on the road. It was the third Stanley Cup Final appearance for the Penguins franchise, the first since consecutive victories during the 1991 and 1992 Stanley Cup Finals. The Red Wings made their 23rd appearance, and first since 2002. The series ended on June 4 with the Red Wings winning in six games.

In game one at Detroit's Joe Louis Arena, the Red Wings opened scoring in the second period with a goal from Mikael Samuelsson before finishing with three goals in the third period from Samuelsson, Dan Cleary and Henrik Zetterberg, shutting out the Penguins 4–0. In preparation for Game 2, Head Coach Michel Therrien revised Pittsburgh's lines; the changes included starting Gary Roberts, who did not play in Game 1.

In Game 2, the Penguins were shut-out for a second time. Detroit's Brad Stuart and Tomas Holmstrom scored in the first period and Valtteri Filppula added a third goal in the third period. Pittsburgh struggled, failing to direct a shot on goal for the first 12 minutes of the game. Pittsburgh shuffled their lineup again prior to Game 3, replacing defenseman Kris Letang with Darryl Sydor.

Game 3 saw the Penguins score their first goal of the Final when Crosby netted a wrist shot 17:25 into the opening period. Crosby added his second goal of the game early in the second period. In the third, Adam Hall added the game-winning goal in the final period with assists from Maxime Talbot and Roberts. The Penguins held off a late charge by the Red Wings to win their first game of the Stanley Cup Final by a score of 3–2.

Entering Game 4, Sykora said the game was a must-win for the Penguins: "For us, basically, [Game 4] is a do-or-die game." Despite an early goal from Marian Hossa, the Penguins were unable to hold off the Red Wings, who got goals from Nicklas Lidstrom and Jiri Hudler. The Penguins' inability to capitalize on a 5-on-3 man advantage in the 3rd period, which lasted for 1:26, sealed the third victory of the series for the Red Wings.

In Game 5 of the series, Pittsburgh faced elimination in Detroit, where they had not yet won in the series. Down 3–2 with 35 seconds remaining in regulation, Talbot scored for the Penguins, who had removed goaltender Marc-Andre Fleury to gain an extra skater. The goal tied the game at three, forcing it into sudden-death overtime. In the third overtime period, Sykora scored at the 109:57 mark of the game to give the Penguins the victory and force Game 6. Sykora's goal was assisted by Malkin, who had struggled in the series, and Gonchar, who was returning for his first shift in 50 minutes due to an injury. In the fifth-longest Stanley Cup game in history, goaltender Fleury stopped 55 shots, with 24 in overtime. Ryan Malone played in Game 6, despite being hit in the face with the puck in Game 5. Dave Molinari of the Pittsburgh Post-Gazette wrote that the team "seemed almost in awe of the way Malone reacted to a significant facial injury the way most people would a paper cut."

In Game 6, Pittsburgh got goals from Malkin, his first in the Finals, and Hossa. Entering the final minute and trailing by one, Pittsburgh pulled Fleury for the second time that game, hoping to score with circumstances similar to Hossa's earlier goal. A tipped shot which passed in between Chris Osgood and the goal line as time expired did not enter the net, giving Detroit the victory. Pittsburgh's final defeat of the season was by a score of 3–2.

Playoff log

|- style="background:#cfc;"
| 1 || April 9 || Ottawa || 0–4 || Pittsburgh || || Roberts (2), Sykora, Malkin || || Fleury || 17,132 || 1–0
|- style="background:#cfc;"
| 2 || April 11 || Ottawa || 3–5|| Pittsburgh || || Gonchar, Sykora (2), Malone (2) || Donovan, Stillman, Bass || Fleury || 17,132 || 2–0
|- style="background:#cfc;"
| 3 || April 14 || Pittsburgh || 4–1 || Ottawa || || Talbot, Crosby, Staal, Hossa || Foligno || Fleury || 19,961 || 3–0
|- style="background:#cfc;"
| 4 || April 16 || Pittsburgh || 3–1 || Ottawa || || Malkin, Ruutu, Crosby || Stillman || Fleury || 19,954 || 4–0
|-

|- style="background:#cfc;"
| 1 || April 25 || NY Rangers || 4–5 || Pittsburgh || || Ruutu, Dupuis, Hossa, Sykora, Malkin || Straka, Avery, Drury, Gomez || Fleury || 17,132 || 1–0 
|- style="background:#cfc;"
| 2 || April 27 || NY Rangers || 0–2 || Pittsburgh || || Staal, Hall || || Fleury || 17,132 || 2–0 
|- style="background:#cfc;"
| 3 || April 29 || Pittsburgh || 5–3 || NY Rangers ||  || Hossa, Laraque, Malkin (2), Malone || Straka, Callahan, Jagr || Fleury || 18,200  || 3–0 
|- style="background:#fcf;"
| 4 || May 1 || Pittsburgh || 0–3 || NY Rangers ||  ||  || Jagr (2), Dubinsky || Fleury || 18,200 || 3–1
|- style="background:#cfc;"
| 5 || May 4 || NY Rangers || 2–3 || Pittsburgh || 1 || Hossa (2), Malkin || Korpikoski, Dawes || Fleury  || 17,132 || 4–1
|-

|- style="background:#cfc;"
| 1 || May 9 ||Philadelphia || 2–4 || Pittsburgh || || Sykora, Crosby, Malkin (2) || Richards (2) || Fleury || 17,132 || 1–0
|- style="background:#cfc;"
| 2 || May 11 || Philadelphia|| 2–4 || Pittsburgh || || Crosby, Hossa, Talbot, Staal || Carter, Richards  || Fleury || 17,132 || 2–0
|- style="background:#cfc;"
| 3 || May 13 || Pittsburgh  || 4–1 || Philadelphia  || || Whitney, Hossa (2), Malone || Umberger || Fleury || 19,965 || 3–0
|- style="background:#fcf;"
| 4 || May 15 || Pittsburgh  || 2–4 ||Philadelphia  || || Staal (2) || Lupul (2), Briere, Carter || Fleury || 19,965 || 3–1
|- style="background:#cfc;"
| 5 || May 18 ||Philadelphia || 0–6 || Pittsburgh || || Malone (2), Malkin, Hossa, Staal, Dupuis || || Fleury || 17,132 || 4–1
|-

|- style="background:#fcf;"
| 1 || May 24 || Pittsburgh  || 0–4 || Detroit || || || Samuelsson (2), Cleary, Zetterberg || Fleury || 20,066 || 0–1 
|- style="background:#fcf;"
| 2 || May 26 || Pittsburgh || 0–3 || Detroit || || ||Stuart, Holmstrom, Filppula || Fleury || 20,066 || 0–2
|- style="background:#cfc;"
| 3 || May 28 || Detroit || 2–3 || Pittsburgh || ||Crosby (2), Hall ||Franzen, Samuelsson || Fleury || 17,132 || 1–2
|- style="background:#fcf;"
| 4 || May 31 || Detroit || 2–1 || Pittsburgh || ||Hossa ||Lidstrom, Hudler || Fleury || 17,132 || 1–3
|- style="background:#cfc;"
| 5 || June 2 || Pittsburgh || 4–3 || Detroit || 3 ||Hossa, Hall, Talbot, Sykora || Helm, Datsyuk, Rafalsiki || Fleury || 20,066 || 2–3
|- style="background:#fcf;"
| 6 || June 4 || Detroit || 3–2 || Pittsburgh || ||Malkin, Hossa || Rafalski, Filppula, Zetterberg || Fleury || 17,132 || 2–4
|-

|- style="text-align:center;"
| Legend:       = Win       = Loss

Player in italics scored winning goal.

Player statistics
Skaters

 

Goaltenders

†Denotes player spent time with another team before joining Team.  Stats reflect time with the Team only.
‡Denotes player was traded mid-season.  Stats reflect time with the Team only.

Awards and records

Tyler Kennedy, Jonathan Filewich, Chris Minard and Alex Goligoski played in their first NHL games. Kennedy, Minard and Connor James scored their first goals, while Goligoski, Ryan Stone and Ty Conklin recorded first points. Evgeni Malkin recorded his first hat trick on January 3.

In addition, Evgeni Malkin, Maxime Talbot and Ryan Malone scored their first playoff goals. Rob Scuderi, Tyler Kennedy and Kris Letang recorded their first playoff points. Marc-Andre Fleury recorded his first playoff shutout.

Awards
Evgeni Malkin was added to the All-Star Game on January 22 as a replacement following an injury to Sidney Crosby. In the game, Malkin recorded two assists. On April 29, the NHL announced that Malkin, along with Alexander Ovechkin and Jarome Iginla, was named as a finalist for the Hart Memorial Trophy, awarded to the player most valuable to his team. With 106 points, Malkin was the Penguins' leader in scoring. He finished second in the NHL only to Ovechkin. At one point in the season, Malkin recorded a 15-game point streak, the longest by a Russian player in the NHL. In June, he was announced as the NHL's top center and honored on the First All-Star Team alongside Ovechkin and Iginla, defensemen Nicklas Lidstrom and Dion Phaneuf and goaltender Evgeni Nabokov.

The Penguins benefited from the success of several players who were called up from the team's American Hockey League (AHL) affiliate, the Wilkes-Barre/Scranton Penguins. Forward Tyler Kennedy was first recalled on October 27. Defenseman Kris Letang was recalled on November 13 and immediately contributed to the Penguins shootout, scoring on all of his first five attempts, including during the Winter Classic on January 1. Of his five shots, three won the game for the Penguins. Kennedy and Letang were selected to compete in the YoungStars competition for rookies during the All-Star break.

On April 2, following the final home game against the Philadelphia Flyers, the team announced its award winners for the season. Awards were given by the Pittsburgh chapter of the Professional Hockey Writers Association, the Penguins Booster Club, as well as voted amongst the team.

Transactions

Free agents
The free agency period began on July 1. The Penguins saw forward Michel Ouellet and goaltender Jocelyn Thibault leave as free agents to the Tampa Bay Lightning and Buffalo Sabres, respectively. To fill openings in the Penguins roster, the team signed goaltender Dany Sabourin, defenseman Darryl Sydor and forwards Petr Sykora and Adam Hall. The organization also signed forwards Nathan Smith, Chris Minard and Jeff Taffe, as well as goaltender Ty Conklin for their AHL minor league affiliate, the Wilkes-Barre/Scranton Penguins.

Trades

On December 5, following talk of the team's future with Mark Recchi, the team placed the veteran right wing on waivers. After clearing without being claimed, Recchi was assigned to the Wilkes-Barre/Scranton Penguins of the AHL the next day. The following day, before playing a game with Wilkes-Barre/Scranton, Recchi was placed on re-entry waivers, where he could again be claimed by another team. On Saturday, December 8, Recchi was claimed by the Atlanta Thrashers, with whom he joined the following Tuesday. The Penguins and the Thrashers would split the remaining cost of his US$1.75 million contract.

On February 26, just minutes before the trade deadline, the Penguins made a deal with the Atlanta Thrashers to acquire right wings Marian Hossa and Pascal Dupuis in exchange for winger Colby Armstrong, center Erik Christensen, prospect Angelo Esposito and a first-round pick in the 2008 NHL Entry Draft. In another trade, the Pens brought in the 6-foot-7 defenseman Hal Gill from the Toronto Maple Leafs in exchange for one second- and one fifth-round pick in the 2008 and 2009 NHL Entry Draft, respectively.

Draft picks
The 2007 NHL Entry Draft took place on June 22 and 23 at Nationwide Arena in Columbus, Ohio. With the 20th overall pick, the Penguins selected Angelo Esposito of the Quebec Remparts in the first round. The Penguins selected eight players (five forwards and three defensemen) in six of the seven rounds. All of the players remained with their junior league teams in Canada.

Draft notes

 The Atlanta Thrashers' third-round pick (from the New York Rangers) went to the Pittsburgh Penguins as a result of a February 27, 2007 trade that sent Chris Thorburn to the Thrashers in exchange for this pick.
 The Minnesota Wild's third-round pick went to the Pittsburgh Penguins as a result of a February 27, 2007 trade that sent Dominic Moore to the Wild in exchange for this pick.
 The Pittsburgh Penguins' third-round pick went to the Nashville Predators as the result of a July 19, 2006 trade that sent Libor Pivko and the rights to Dominic Moore to the Penguins in exchange for this pick.
 The Detroit Red Wings' fourth-round pick went to the Pittsburgh Penguins as a result of a March 9, 2006 trade that sent Cory Cross to the Red Wings in exchange for this pick.
 The Pittsburgh Penguins' seventh-round pick went to the San Jose Sharks as the result of a February 27, 2007 trade that sent Nolan Schaefer to the Penguins in exchange for this pick.

Farm teams
The Wilkes-Barre/Scranton Penguins finished first in the AHL East Division during the 2007–08 season. In the Calder Cup Playoffs, the "Baby Penguins" advanced through the Eastern Conference bracket with a record of 12–5. In the Calder Cup Final, they lost to the Chicago Wolves (ATL), four games to two.

In the ECHL, the Wheeling Nailers, a joint affiliate with the Philadelphia Flyers, finished last in the Northern Division, with a final record of 22–43–3–4.

See also 
 2007–08 NHL season

References

External links 
 Pittsburgh Penguins official site
 Regular season statistics
 Playoff statistics
 Season schedule and results

2007-08
2007–08 in American ice hockey by team
2007–08 NHL season by team
2007-2008
2008 Stanley Cup
Pitts
Pitts